The 1992–93 season was Burnley's first season in the third tier of English football. They were managed by Jimmy Mullen in his first full season since he replaced Frank Casper during the 1991–1992 campaign.

Appearances and goals

|}

Transfers

In

Out

Matches

Football League Second Division
Key

In Result column, Burnley's score shown first
H = Home match
A = Away match

pen. = Penalty kick
o.g. = Own goal

Results

Final league position

FA Cup

League Cup

Football League Trophy

References

Burnley F.C. seasons
Burnley